Agi Pratama (born 17 March 1996, in Banjarmasin) is an Indonesian professional footballer who plays as a forward and attacking midfielder for Liga 2 club Nusantara United.

Club career

PS Barito Putera
Agi is the youngest player in the PS Barito Putera squad. He played his first match in the 2015 Indonesia Super League as a substitute and scored of goal for a Barito Putera 2-0 win over Persela Lamongan after Talaohu Musafri also scored at the end of the game.

In the 2016 season, in the second half, Agi replaced Paulo Sitanggang and scored against Persegres Gresik United.

PSPS Pekanbaru
In half season of Indonesian Liga 1 2017 edition, he has been loaned from Barito to PSPS Pekanbaru.

PSS Sleman
Agi move from PSPS to PSS in round of 16 of 2017 Liga 2 seasons, because coach Freddy Muli want to enhance strikers in his team squad.

In the match against Cilegon United, Agi give one assist, and match end in draw 2-2.

Honours

Club
Persis Solo
 Liga 2: 2021

References

External links
 Agi Pratama at Liga Indonesia
 Agi Pratama at Soccerway

1996 births
Muba Babel United F.C. players
BaBel United F.C. players
Indonesian footballers
PS Barito Putera players
PSPS Pekanbaru players
PSS Sleman players
PSM Makassar players
Liga 1 (Indonesia) players
People from Banjarmasin
Association football forwards
Living people